The 2016 German Athletics Championships were held at the Auestadion in Kassel on 18–19 June 2016.

Results

Men

Women

External links 
 Official website of the Deutscher Leichtathletik-Verband (DLV; German Athletics Association) 
 Full results 

2016
2016 in athletics (track and field)
2016 in German sport
Sport in Kassel
21st century in Kassel